Spilarctia quercii is a moth in the family Erebidae. It was described by Charles Oberthür in 1911. It is found in the Chinese provinces of Sichuan, Gansu, Shanxi, Shaanxi, Qinghai, Hubei, Yunnan and Hunan.

References

Moths described in 1911
quercii